The Flippin–Lodge angle is one of two angles used by organic and biological chemists studying the relationship between a molecule's chemical structure and ways that it reacts, for reactions involving "attack" of an electron-rich reacting species, the nucleophile, on an electron-poor reacting species, the electrophile. Specifically, the angles—the Bürgi–Dunitz, and the Flippin–Lodge, —describe the "trajectory" or "angle of attack" of the nucleophile as it approaches the electrophile, in particular when the latter is planar in shape. This is called a nucleophilic addition reaction and it plays a central role in the biological chemistry taking place in many biosyntheses in nature, and is a central "tool" in the reaction toolkit of modern organic chemistry, e.g., to construct new molecules such as pharmaceuticals. Theory and use of these angles falls into the areas of synthetic and physical organic chemistry, which deals with chemical structure and reaction mechanism, and within a sub-specialty called structure correlation.

Because chemical reactions take place in three dimensions, their quantitative description is, in part, a geometry problem. Two angles, first the Bürgi–Dunitz angle, and later the Flippin–Lodge angle, were developed to describe the approach of the reactive atom of a nucleophile (a point off of a plane) to the reactive atom of an electrophile (a point on a plane). The  is an angle that estimates the displacement of the nucleophile, at its elevation, toward or away from the particular R and R' substituents attached to the electrophilic atom (see image). The  is the angle between the approach vector connecting these two atoms and the plane containing the electrophile (see the Bürgi–Dunitz article). Reactions addressed using these angle concepts use nucleophiles ranging from single atoms (e.g., chloride anion, Cl–) and polar organic functional groups (e.g., primary amines, R"-NH2), to complex chiral catalyst reaction systems and enzyme active sites. These nucleophiles can be paired with an array of planar electrophiles: aldehydes and ketones, carboxylic acid-derivatives, and the carbon-carbon double bonds of alkenes.

The most prominent application and impact of the Flippin–Lodge angle has been in the area of chemistry where it was originally defined: in practical synthetic studies of the outcome of carbon-carbon bond-forming reactions in solution.  An important example is the aldol reaction, e.g., addition of ketone-derived nucleophiles (enols, enolates), to electrophilic aldehydes that have attached groups varying in size and polarity. Of particular interest, given the three-dimensional nature of the concept, is understanding how the combined features on the nucleophile and electrophile impact the stereochemistry of reaction outcomes (i.e., the "handedness" of new  chiral centers created by a reaction). Studies invoking Flippin–Lodge angles in synthetic chemistry have improved the ability of chemists to predict outcomes of known reactions, and to design better reactions to produce particular stereoisomers (enantiomers and diastereomers) needed in the construction of complex natural products and drugs.

Technical introduction 
The Flippin–Lodge (FL) angle,  is the latter-derived of two angles that fully define the geometry of "attack" (approach via collision) of a nucleophile on a trigonal unsaturated center of an electrophilic molecule (the second being the Bürgi–Dunitz angle, see below). Theory and application of these angles falls into the area of synthetic, and of physical organic chemistry (in the specializations of chemical structure and reaction mechanism), in the latter, within a sub-specialty called structure correlation.

Nucleophiles in this addition reaction may range from single atoms (hydride, chloride), to polar organic functional groups (amines, alcohols), to complex systems (nucleophilic enolates with chiral catalysts, amino acid side chains in enzyme active sites; see below). Planar electrophiles include aldehydes and ketones, carboxylic acid-derivatives such as esters, and amides, and the carbon-carbon double bonds of particular alkenes (olefins). In the example of nucleophilic attack at a carbonyl,  is a measure of the "offset" of the nucleophile's approach to the electrophile, toward one or the other of the two substituents attached to the carbonyl carbon. The relative values of angles for pairs of reactions can be inferred and semiquantitative, based on rationalizations of the products of the reactions; alternatively, as noted in the figure,  values may be formally derived from crystallographic coordinates by geometric calculations, or graphically, e.g., after projection of Nu onto the carbonyl plane and measuring the angle supplementary to  LNu'-C-O (where Nu' is the projected atom). This often overlooked angle of the nucleophile's trajectory was named the Flippin-Lodge angle by Clayton H. Heathcock after his contributing collaborators Lee A. Flippin and Eric P. Lodge. The second angle defining the geometry, the more well known Bürgi–Dunitz angle, describes the Nu-C-O bond angle and was named after crystallographers Hans-Beat Bürgi and Jack D. Dunitz, its first senior investigators (see that related article).

As an experimental observable 
These angles are best construed to mean the angles observed (measured) for a given system, and not an historically observed range in values (e.g., as in the  range of the original Bürgi–Dunitz aminoketones), or an idealized value computed for a particular system (such as the  = 0° for hydride addition to formaldehyde).

 away from the larger substituent attached to the electrophilic center, or
 away from the more electron-rich substituent (where these two and other factors can be in a complex competition, see below); 
hence, as noted,  for reaction of a simple nucleophile with a symmetrically substituted carbonyl (R = R', or other symmetric planar electrophile) is expected to be 0° in vacuo or in solutio, e.g., as in the case of the computed and experimental addition of hydride (H–) to formaldehyde (H2C=O).

Steric and orbital contributions to its value 

In contrast to the Bürgi–Dunitz angle, and using the case of carbonyl additions as example: the  angle adopted during an approach by the nucleophile to a trigonal electrophile depends in complex fashion on:
 the relative steric size of the two substituents attached to (alpha to) the electrophilic carbonyl, which give rise to varying degrees of repulsive van der Waals's interactions (e.g., giving  ≈ 7° for hydride attack on pivaldehyde (see image), where R=tertiary-butyl, and R'=H),
 the electronic characteristics of substituents alpha to the carbonyl, where heteroatom-containing substituents can, through their stereoelectronic influence, function as overly intrusive steric groups (e.g., giving  ≈ 40-50° for esters and amides with small R' groups, since R is an O- and N-substituent, respectively), and
 the nature of the bonds made by more distant atoms to the atoms alpha to the carbonyl, e.g., where the energy of the σ* molecular orbital (MO) between the alpha- and beta-substituents was seen to compete with the foregoing influences,
as well as on the MO shapes and occupancies of the carbonyl and attacking nucleophile. Hence, the  observed for nucleophilic attack appears to be influenced primarily by the energetics of the HOMO-LUMO overlap of the nucleophile-electrophile pair in the systems studied—see the Bürgi–Dunitz article, and the related inorganic chemistry concept of the angular overlap model (AOM)—which leads in many cases to a convergence of  values (but not all, see below); however, the  required to provide optimal overlap between HOMO and LUMO reflect the complex interplay of energetic contributions described with examples above.

Origin and current scope of concept 
In applying both angles of the nucleophile trajectory to real chemical reactions, the HOMO-LUMO centered view of the Bürgi-Dunitz angle, is modified to include further complex, electrophile-specific attractive and repulsive  electrostatic and van der Waals interactions that can alter  and bias  toward one substituent or the other (see above).

Finally, in constrained environments (e.g., in enzyme and nanomaterial binding sites), these angles, when characterized, appear to be quite distinct, an observation conjectured to arise because reactivity is not based on random collision, and so the relationship between orbital overlap principles and reactivity is more complex. At the same time, the subtilisin  was 88° (quite distinct from the hydride-formaldehyde  value of 107°, see the Bürgi–Dunitz article), and  angle values from the careful literature compilation clustered at 89 ± 7° (i.e., only slightly offset from directly above or below the carbonyl carbon).

Applications 

The Flippin-Lodge and Bürgi-Dunitz angles were central, practically, to the development of a clearer understanding of asymmetric induction during nucleophilic attack at hindered carbonyl centers in synthetic organic chemistry. It was in this area that  was first defined by Heathcock, and has been primarily used. Larger substituents around the electrophilic center, such as tert-butyls, lead to higher stereoselectivities in asymmetric induction than smaller substituents like methyls. The trajectory of the nucleophile approaching a center flanked by two large substituents is more limited, i.e. the Flippin–Lodge angle is smaller. For example, in Mukaiyama aldol addition, the bulkier phenyl tert-butyl ketone has a higher selectivity for the syn isomer than the smaller phenyl methyl ketone. Likewise, if bulky a nucleophile, such as a t-butylmethylsilyl enolate, is used, the selectivity is higher than for a small nucleophile like a lithium enolate.

Given a reaction system of a given nucleophile with a carbonyl having the two substituents R and R', where substituent R' is sterically small relative to substituent R (e.g., R' = hydrogen atom, R = phenyl), the  values that are inferred from the reaction outcomes and theoretical studies tend to be larger; alternatively, if the hydrocarbon substituents are nearer or equal in steric size, the inferred values diminish and may approach zero (e.g., R' = tert-butyl, R = phenyl). Thus, from the perspective of simpler electrophile systems where only steric bulk come into play, the attack trajectories of the classes of nucleophiles studied makes clear that as the disparity in size between the substituent increase, there is a perturbation in the FL angle that can be used to provide higher stereoselectivities in designed reaction systems; while the patterns become more complex when factors other than steric bulk come into play (see section above on orbital contributions), Flippin, Lodge, and Heathcock were able to show that generalizations could be made that were useful to reaction design.

A surpassing area of application has been in studies of various aldol reactions, the addition of ketone-derived enol/enolate nucleophiles to electrophilic aldehydes, each with functional groups varying in size and group polarity; the way that features on the nucleophile and electrophile impact the stereochemistry seen in reaction products, and in particular, the diastereoselection exhibited, has been carefully mapped (see the steric and orbital description above, the aldol reaction article, and David Evans' related Harvard teaching materials on the aldol). These studies have improved the chemists' abilities to design enantioselective and diastereoselective reactions needed in the construction of complex molecules, such as the natural product spongistatins and modern drugs. It remains to be seen whether a particular range of  values contributes similarly to the arrangement of functional groups within proteins and so to their conformational stabilities (as has been reported in relation to the BD trajectory), or to other BD-correlated stabilizations of conformation important to structure and reactivity.

See also 
 Bürgi–Dunitz angle

Notes

References

Bibliography 

 
  
  
  
  
 
  

Physical organic chemistry
Organic chemistry
Biochemistry